Shri Camel is an album by experimental music and classical minimalism pioneer Terry Riley.  Riley began composing the work in 1975 on commission from West Germany's Radio Bremen, and performed an early version of the work in Bremen in May 1976. In 1978 Riley recorded a different version of the piece, separated into four suites, at CBS Studios in San Francisco as the final part of a three album deal with CBS; however, CBS did not release the recording until 1980.

For the studio recording, Riley performed the work solo on a modified Yamaha YC-45D combo organ tuned in just intonation and augmented with studio digital delay.

Track listing
 "Anthem of the Trinity" – 9:25
 "Celestial Valley" - 11:32
 "Across the Lake of the Ancient World" - 7:26
 "Desert of Ice" - 15:13

References

Terry Riley albums
1980 albums
Albums produced by Terry Riley
CBS Records albums